Franz Pfitscher (3 October 1930 – 26 February 2009) was an Austrian boxer. He competed in the men's light heavyweight event at the 1952 Summer Olympics.

References

1930 births
2009 deaths
Austrian male boxers
Olympic boxers of Austria
Boxers at the 1952 Summer Olympics
People from Taormina
Light-heavyweight boxers
Sportspeople from the Province of Messina
20th-century Austrian people